The 1930 Presbyterian Blue Hose football team represented Presbyterian College as a member the Southern Intercollegiate Athletic Association (SIAA) during the 1930 college football season. Led by 15th-year head coach Walter A. Johnson, the Blue Hose compiled an overall record of 9–1, with a mark of 6–0 in conference play, and won the SIAA championship.

Schedule

References

Presbyterian
Presbyterian Blue Hose football seasons
Presbyterian Blue Hose football